The 43rd Annual American Music Awards was held at the Microsoft Theater in Los Angeles, California on November 22, 2015. It was broadcast on ABC and hosted by Jennifer Lopez. With three awards, Taylor Swift was the big winner of the night. Jared Leto presented a eulogy mourning the November 2015 Paris attacks prior to presenting Celine Dion for her tributing performance. The show also marked Prince's last public award show appearance before his death in April 2016. The telecast garnered 10.98 million viewers in the United States.

Performances

Presenters

Rebecca Black
Paula Abdul
Kelsea Ballerini
Ashley Benson
Betty Cantrell
Nicki Minaj
Ciara
Terry Crews
Hannah Davis
DNCE
Florida Georgia Line
Tyrese Gibson
Ellie Goulding
Gigi Hadid
Fifth Harmony
Julianne Hough
Kylie Jenner
Wiz Khalifa
Taylor Lautner
Jared Leto
Prince
Little Big Town
Tove Lo
Jenny McCarthy
Shawn Mendes
Chloë Grace Moretz
Kevin O'Leary
Norman Reedus
Jeremy Renner
Nick Robinson
Alicia Silverstone
Jeremy Sisto
Hailee Steinfeld
Wilmer Valderrama
Donnie Wahlberg
Zendaya

Source:

Winners and nominees
Charlie Puth and Joe Jonas announced the nominations on October 13, 2015.

References

2015 music awards
2015
American Music Awards
2015 in Los Angeles